Meliboeus is a genus of jewel beetles.

Meliboeus may also refer to:

 Meliboeus, a character in Virgil's Eclogues
 Melibeus, the subject of "The Tale of Melibee", one of Geoffrey Chaucer's Canterbury Tales
 A demonym for the city of Meliboea